Norman C. "Red" Franklin (December 13, 1911 – May 16, 1947) was an American football running back who played for the Brooklyn Dodgers from 1935–1937. He played college football at Oregon State University, earning All-American honors in 1933 . He played in 14 games over three seasons for the Dodgers. He was born in Hope, Rhode Island.

References

1911 births
1947 deaths
People from Scituate, Rhode Island
American football running backs
Oregon State Beavers football players
Brooklyn Dodgers (NFL) players
Players of American football from Rhode Island